is a professional Japanese baseball player. He plays outfielder for the Saitama Seibu Lions.

References 

1993 births
Living people
Baseball people from Sapporo
Nippon Professional Baseball outfielders
Saitama Seibu Lions players